Sarina Joos (born 24 June 2006) is a Swiss figure skater. She is the 2022 CS Warsaw Cup silver medalist. 

On the junior level, Joos is the 2022 European Youth Olympic Winter Festival bronze medalist and a two-time Swiss junior national medalist (silver in 2022, bronze in 2020).

Personal life 
Joos was born on 24 June 2006 in Zürich, Switzerland. She has a younger sister, Noemi, who is also a skater.

Career

2021–22 season 
Making her first appearance on the ISU Junior Grand Prix (JGP) series, Joos placed eleventh in Poland in October 2021. In March, she won bronze at the 2022 European Youth Olympic Festival in Finland.

2022–23 season 
Competing in the 2022–23 ISU Junior Grand Prix series, Joos placed seventh in the Czech Republic and 12th in Poland. She made her senior international debut in September, placing seventh at the 2022 CS Lombardia Trophy in Italy. In November, she won her first senior medal – silver at the 2022 CS Warsaw Cup in Poland.

Programs

Competitive highlights 
CS: Challenger Series; JGP: Junior Grand Prix.

References

External links 
 

2006 births
Living people
Sportspeople from Zürich
Swiss female single skaters